Juchitlán  is a town and municipality, in Jalisco in central-western Mexico. The municipality covers an area of 403.88 km².

As of 2005, the municipality had a total population of 5,282.

References

Municipalities of Jalisco